The Armoured Cavalry Arm is a component of the French Army. It was formed after World War II by merging the combat tank and cavalry branches. It operates the majority of France's armoured vehicles, though a small minority of France's armour is still operated by infantry regiments. It continues the traditions of the French cavalry and combat tank branches from which it is descended, as well as those of the defunct horse artillery, from which it is not actually descended. 

Its training establishment is the Cavalry School in Saumur.

Military doctrine 

The employment doctrine of the Arme blindée et cavalerie includes the traditional missions of the cavalry adapted to a modern context:
 Rupture of the front, using the charge (jointly with aviation);
 Exploitation of this rupture, thanks to the speed of movement given by motorized and all-terrain vehicles
 Cover of a retreat, a friendly body, a void between two friendly bodies by mask effect
 Reconnaissance (but in an increasingly limited way, aviation, radars and satellites having largely supplanted it in this mission)

Since the end of the USSR, the usefulness of the armoured troops has sometimes been questioned, however it has participated in all major external operations in Bosnia, Lebanon, Africa and Afghanistan. For the latter country, it is clear that the terrain lends itself poorly to the use of armored vehicles: a strong relief making maneuvers complicated, the French armored cavalry deployed has less than 120 men, or less than 3% of the workforce.

Finally, the regiments saw their number of squadrons reduced but 20% of them are also permanently projected.

List of regiments 
In 2020, the Armoured Cavalry Branch of the French Army consisted of:

3 Tank regiments, which field 60x Leclerc main battle tanks each:
 1er Régiment de Chasseurs (1er RCh) in Verdun
 5e Régiment de Dragons (5e RD) in Mailly-le-Camp
 501e Régiment de Chars de Combat (501e RCC) in Mourmelon-le-Grand

5 Cavalry regiments, which field a mix of AMX 10 RC and ERC 90 wheeled tanks:

 1er Régiment Étranger de Cavalerie (1er REC) in Marseille 
 1er Régiment de Spahis (1er RS) in Valence
 1er Régiment de Hussards Parachutistes (1er RHP) in Tarbes
 3e Régiment de Hussards (3e RH) in Metz
 4e Régiment de Chasseurs (4e RCh) in Gap

4 combat support regiments:
 1er Régiment de Chasseurs d'Afrique (1er RCA) training regiment in Canjuers
 2e Régiment de Dragons (2 RD) NBC-defense regiment in Fontevraud-l'Abbaye
 2e Régiment de Hussards (2e RH) reconnaissance regiment in Haguenau
 13e Régiment de Dragons Parachutistes (13e RDP) long range reconnaissance regiment in Martignas-sur-Jalle

2 Troops Initial Formation Centres:
 Centre de Formation Initiale des Militaires du rang 7e Brigade Blindée / 3e Régiment de Chasseurs d'Afrique (CFIM 7e BB - 3e RCA), in Valdahon 
 Centre de Formation Initiale des Militaires du rang de la 2e Brigade Blindée / 12e Régiment de Chasseurs d'Afrique (CFIM 2e BB - 12e RCA), in Bitche 

1 overseas regiment:
 5e Régiment de Cuirassiers (5e RC) in Abu Dhabi (United Arab Emirates)

Training

Cavalry School 
At the end of the Second World War, the cavalry (mainly in charge of reconnaissance) and the battle tanks merged to give birth to the Armored Weapon and Cavalry (ABC). The Saumur Cavalry Application School then became the Armor and Cavalry Application School (EAABC). The Saumur Armored Museum, originally called the “Armored Equipment Documentation Center” (CEDB), was founded in 1965 to help train EAABC students.

CSEM 
The Military Equestrian Sports Center (CSEM), located in Fontainebleau (Seine-et-Marne) trains soldiers and French army horses in equestrian sports with the aim of participating in national and international competitions. Since 1977, the CSEM has guarded the standard of the 8th Dragoon Regiment.

Notes and references

External links 
  Official site of the Arme Blindée Cavalerie
  Site of the UNABCC
  Site on French tanks
  Forum on armoured engines
 http://cavaliers.blindes.free.fr/

Articles with empty sections from July 2010
All articles with empty sections
Nationstate armoured warfare branches
Arms of the French Army
Military articles needing translation from French Wikipedia